Lawrence William Lamm (April 28, 1896 - August 28, 1995) was a pioneer in the U.S. book packaging industry. An editor at Macmillan, he became a founder of the Book League of America.

Biography
He was born in Manhattan, New York City on April 28, 1896. He died in Stamford, Connecticut on August 28, 1995.

References

1896 births
1995 deaths
People from Manhattan
American book publishers (people)